Marinella - Ta oreotera tragoudia mou (Greek: Μαρινέλλα - Τα ωραιότερα τραγούδια μου) is a compilation of recordings by popular Greek singer Marinella, under the PolyGram Records - Philips series "Ta Oreotera Tragoudia Mou". This album is part of the compilation. It was released in 1974 in Greece and includes 14 recordings by Marinella from 1967 - 1972 for the PolyGram label.

Track listing 
Side One.
 "Apopse se thelo" (Απόψε σε θέλω; Tonight I want you) – (Mimis Plessas - Lefteris Papadopoulos)
 This song had been released on Otan Simani Esperinos and as a single on 7 July 1969.
 "Stalia - stalia" (Σταλιά - σταλιά; Drop by drop) – (Giorgos Zampetas - Dionisis Tzefronis)
 This song had been released on Stalia – Stalia and as a single on 11 March 1968.
 "Ti na ftei" (Τι να φταίει; What is wrong?) – (Giorgos Zampetas - Dimitris Christodoulou)
 This song had been released on Otan Simani Esperinos and as a single on 10 June 1969.
 "Anixe petra (na kleisto)" (Άνοιξε πέτρα; Open, stone) – (Mimis Plessas-Lefteris Papadopoulos)
 This song had been released on Stalia – Stalia and as a single on 11 November 1968.
 "Otan simani Esperinos" (Όταν σημάνει Εσπερινός; When the Vesper bells are ringing) – (Nakis Petridis - Sevi Tiliakou)
 This song had been released on Otan Simani Esperinos and as a single on 15 February 1969.
 "Pali tha klapso" (Πάλι θα κλάψω; Again, I will cry) – (Nakis Petridis - Sevi Tiliakou)
 This song had been released on Ena Tragoudi Ein' I Zoi Mou and as a single on 5 December 1969.
 "Pios in' aftos"  (Ποιος είν' αυτός; Who is this guy?) – (Giorgos Zampetas-Pythagoras)
 This song had been released on Stalia – Stalia and as a single on 30 November 1968.
Side Two.
 "Piretos (Kathe gnorimia)" (Πυρετός; Fever) – (Akis Panou)
 This song had been released as a single on 13 April 1971. A live version appears on Mia Vradia Me Tin Marinella.
 "Simvivazomaste" (Συμβιβαζόμαστε; We're compromising) – (Giorgos Hadjinasios - Tasos Economou)
 This song had been released as a single on 27 March 1972. A live version appears on Mia Vradia Me Tin Marinella.
 "I antres den klene" (Οι άντρες δεν κλαίνε; Men don't cry) – (Giorgos Katsaros - Pythagoras)
 This song had been released on Stalia – Stalia and as a single on 16 February 1968.
 "Piso apo tis kalamies" (Πίσω από τις καλαμιές; Behind the reeds) – (Giorgos Katsaros - Pythagoras)
 This song had been released on Stalia – Stalia and as a single on 21 December 1967.
 "Katigoro" (Κατηγορώ; I blame) – (Giorgos Hadjinasios - Giannis Politis)
 This song had been released on Marinella - Enas mythos and as a single on 2 September 1970.
 "Akouste" - (Ακούστε; Harken) – (Giorgos Katsaros - Pythagoras)
 This song had been released as a single on 12 January 1972. A live version appears on Mia Vradia Me Tin Marinella.
 "Krima to mpoi sou" (Κρίμα το μπόι σου; Shame on your height) – (Giorgos Hadjinasios-Sevi Tiliakou)
 This song had been released on Marinella (Enas mythos) and as a single on 14 May 1970.

Personnel 
 Marinella - vocals, background vocals
 Marios Kostoglou - background vocals on tracks 13 and 14
 Yiannis Smyrneos - recording engineer
 PolyGram Records - producer

References

1974 albums
1974 compilation albums
Greek-language albums
Marinella compilation albums
Universal Music Greece albums